The Triumph Tina also known as the Triumph T10 was a small and low-performance scooter with a  two-stroke engine, an automatic transmission, and a handlebar carry basket.

Development
In 1962, despite internal opposition from those who felt it would dilute the macho image of the brand, Triumph introduced a new scooter, designed by Edward Turner, to tap into a strong demand that had been identified by market research for a simple and easy-to-ride "shopping basket" vehicle.

The Tina used a continuously variable transmission (CVT) system with a centrifugal clutch; the system had been patented by Turner and Triumph in May 1959.  The engine was mounted on the swingarm.
 
An extensive marketing campaign was carried out, fronted by a pop star of the era, Cliff Richard. The Tina was marketed to women, and advertising focused on the ease of its operation. Despite this the Tina sold in small numbers.

The Tina's patented drivetrain had technical problems. The CVT drive belt would derail and seize the transmission and the rear wheel, disabling the scooter and also preventing it from being pushed. Also, the starting procedure for the Tina required moving a switch on the handlebar to "start" before kick starting the scooter; this activated a governor to keep the engine speed too low to activate the transmission. If the switch was in "drive" on starting the scooter, it would accelerate immediately; this happened to Turner, causing a crash into a kerb and a broken ankle.

T10
The Tina was replaced by the Triumph T10 in 1965. The T10 included an improved CVT and the "start/drive" control moved from the handlebar to inside the seat, with the "drive" setting  activated automatically by the rider's weight, so that the drive was only engaged once the driver was seated. This led to an embarrassing incident while demonstrating the T10 at its press launch. The T10 was discontinued about 1970.

Three-wheeled prototypes
Triumph made a series of twelve prototype Tina tilting three-wheelers, similar in concept to the Ariel 3 moped. Disagreements between Triumph and the system's designer ended any plans for production.

See also
Triumph Tigress – Triumph's earlier and larger scooter, in production from 1958 to 1965.
List of Triumph motorcycles

References

Tina
Motor scooters
Two-stroke motorcycles
Motorcycles introduced in 1962